"Stand Up and Cheer" was written by Paul P. McNeely in 1909 for use at the University of Kansas, where it is still played today as a secondary fight song, and used as the primary fight song at Ohio University, Athens.    It is also played as a secondary fight song at Columbia University.

Another version was created by popular songwriters Lew Brown (lyrics) and Harry Akst (music) for the 1934 film Stand Up and Cheer! starring Shirley Temple.

It is the fight song of:

Western Kentucky University in Bowling Green, Kentucky,
Ohio University in Athens, Ohio,
Montana State University in Bozeman, MT,
Southeast Missouri State University in Cape Girardeau, Missouri
University of North Dakota in Grand Forks, North Dakota,
Concordia College in Moorhead, Minnesota
Franklin College in Franklin, Indiana
 Southwestern Oklahoma State University in Weatherford, Oklahoma
Acadia University in Wolfville, Nova Scotia,
Grove City College in Grove City, Pennsylvania,
Haverhill High School in Haverhill, Massachusetts,
Masconomet Regional High School in Boxford, Massachusetts
Oxford Hills Comprehensive High School in South Paris, Maine
Walter L Sickles High School in Tampa, Florida,
Clarksville High School in Clarksville, Tennessee,
Elizabethtown High School in Elizabethtown, KY
South St. Paul High School in So. St. Paul, MN
Martinsburg High School, in Martinsburg, West Virginia,
Westlake High School, in Westlake, Ohio, 
South Charleston High School in South Charleston, West Virginia, 
 Lawrence High School, Lawrence, Kansas
Fenton High School in Fenton, Michigan,
Madisonville North Hopkins High School in Madisonville, Kentucky,
Bell County High School in Pineville, Kentucky .
Oakwood High School in Dayton, Ohio
Midpark High School in Middleburg Hts., Ohio. 
North Plainfield High School in North Plainfield, New Jersey
Quincy Senior High School in Quincy IL.
 Ona Junior High School in Ona, WV.(formerly)  
 duPont Manual Magnet High School in Louisville, Kentucky.
 Palo Verde High School, Tucson, AZ
 Upper Arlington High School, Upper Arlington, Ohio,
 William Mason High School, Mason, OH
 Zeeland East High School, Zeeland, MI
 Franklin Heights High School, Columbus, OH
 Glenwood High School, Chatham, IL
 Orchard Farm High School, St. Charles, MO
Thomas Worthington High School, Worthington, Ohio
 Worthingway Middle School, Worthington, Ohio
 Kilbourne Middle School, Worthington, Ohio
 Canal Winchester High School, Canal Winchester, Ohio
 Westerville South High School. Westerville, Ohio
 Clinton High School in Clinton, Michigan
 Wichita East High School in Wichita, Kansas
 New Lexington High School, New Lexington Ohio
 Marion-Franklin High School, Columbus, Ohio
 Hiawatha High School in Hiawatha, KS 
 Madison Plains High School, London, Ohio
 Ottawa Hills High School in Ottawa Hills Ohio
 Wahama High School in Mason, West Virginia
 Warren G. Harding High School in Warren, Ohio
 Everett Jr. High/Middle School in Columbus, Ohio
 Camp Hawthorne in Raymond, Maine
 Bellevue High School in Bellevue, Ohio
 Galion High School in Galion, Ohio
 Summit High School in Summit, New Jersey
 Summit High School in Spring Hill, Tennessee
 Benton High School, St. Joseph, MO
 Fulton High School, Middleton, MI
 Danbury High School in Marblehead, Ohio
 Canandaigua Academy in Canandaigua, NY
 Lancaster High School in Lancaster, Ohio
 Union College in Barbourville, KY
 Pulaski County High School in Dublin, VA
 Taylors Falls High School in Taylors Falls, MN

Notes

Further reading
 Studwell, William E. & Bruce R. Schueneman (1998). College Fight Songs: An Annotated Anthology. Binghamton, NY: The Haworth Press.

1909 songs
Acadia Axemen
American college songs
Big Sky Conference fight songs
Big 12 Conference fight songs
Concordia Cobbers
Conference USA fight songs
Franklin Grizzlies
Grove City Wolverines
Ivy League fight songs
Mid-American Conference fight songs
Ohio Valley Conference fight songs
Ohio Bobcats
Montana State Bobcats
North Dakota Fighting Hawks
Shirley Temple songs
Songs with music by Harry Akst
Songs with lyrics by Lew Brown
Southeast Missouri State Redhawks
Southwestern Oklahoma State Bulldogs
Summit League fight songs
Western Kentucky Hilltoppers and Lady Toppers